Thomas Paul Gleeson (March 31, 1880 – November 26, 1956) was an American tennis player. He competed in the men's doubles event at the 1904 Summer Olympics.

References

1880 births
1956 deaths
American male tennis players
Olympic tennis players of the United States
Tennis players at the 1904 Summer Olympics
Tennis people from Missouri